Shaadi Karke Phas Gaya Yaar is a Bollywood romantic comedy film directed by K. S. Adhiyaman best known for directing Hum Tumhare Hain Sanam (2002). Salman Khan and Shilpa Shetty star in the lead roles as husband and wife. Reema Lagoo, Mohnish Behl and Shakti Kapoor also star. The film was remade in Tamil as Priyasakhi with Madhavan and Sadha. The delay of the film meant that Priyasakhi ended up releasing first.

Shooting took place in London, United Kingdom and in India. The film was earlier titled Dil Chura Ke Chal Diye. The film is produced by Bubby Kent who previously produced the Salman Khan starrers Kurbaan (1991), Chandra Mukhi (1993) and Jaanam Samjha Karo (1999). The film released in 2006 after being delayed in production for several years.

Synopsis
Ayaan lives a very wealthy lifestyle with his married brother, Karan and his wife, Anju; a younger sister, Yamini, and brother, Rahul; his mom, and grandma. He runs a garage. One day he meets the beautiful model, Ahana, and falls head over heels in love with her. She forgets her personal diary at his garage. Through this Ayaan woos her, wins her heart, and they get married.

Ahana soon finds out that despite Ayaan's wealth, his family is very conservative and tradition-bound. This causes some bitterness between the newlyweds, which gets worse when she becomes pregnant and wants to abort the child. While visiting her mom on their dog's birthday, Ahana has an accident which results in a miscarriage. Ayaan blames her for losing the child, but his mother convinces him and he apologizes.

Two months later, on Ahana's birthday, she finds out that Ayaan had tricked her through her diary. Ahana decides to get drunk on her birthday and expose Ayaan publicly. Ayaan slaps Ahana for her behavior, she leaves the house. Ahana is once again pregnant and Ayaan goes to court to make sure that Ahana doesn't abort the baby. Through courts permission, Ayaan lives with Ahana at her parents house to keep a watch.

Ahana give birth and Ayaan proceeds on taking the newborn baby home leaving Ahana in the hospital, however, the doctor urges that the baby to stay with the mother for a few month in order for Ahana to feed the baby. During this time period, Ahana becomes attached to her baby and doesn't want to leave the family anymore, however, Ayaan wants nothing to do with Ahana and kicks her out of the house. Finally Ayaan realizes his and Ahana her mistake and the movie ends with them planning for another baby.

Cast

 Salman Khan as Ayaan 
 Shilpa Shetty as Ahana Kapoor
 Reema Lagoo as Isha, Ayaan's mother
 Amneek Sandhu as Naina, Ayaan's sister
 Mohnish Behl as Karan/ Police Constable Harvinder Singh Harvi
 Shakti Kapoor as Mr. Kapoor
 Supriya Karnik as Pammi
 Aasif Sheikh as Bunty / Inspector Sukhwinder Singh Sukhi
 Neena Kulkarni as Ayaan's grandmother
 Kunika Lal as Rammi
 Shoma Anand as a judge
 Sudha Chandran as doctor
Jeetu Verma as College Student

Production
Adhiyaman began making a project titled Mujhse Shaadi Karogi in 2002, a romantic drama featuring Salman Khan and Shilpa Shetty in the lead roles. The project's title was changed to Dil Chura Ke Chal Diye and then to the eventual title Shaadi Karke Phas Gaya Yaar and the film was completed within a year, though the producers delayed the film's release indefinitely. Delays meant that Adhiyaman chose to remake the film and release it swiftly in Tamil as Priyasakhi with a new cast, while he was still waiting for the Hindi film to have a theatrical release.

Soundtrack

Release 
In a review of the film, The Times of India noted that "It's good to market parampara, but it's awful to package it in outmoded plastic. Haven't we already said ‘No' to plastic emotions and pulp fiction!" Sify wrote that "And there's no reason to see this film unless you are a diehard fan of the lead pair who instil a shred of believability into their dangerously uni-dimensional character".

References

External links
 

2006 films
2000s Hindi-language films
Films shot in India
Films shot in London
Films about Indian weddings
Films scored by Sajid–Wajid
Indian romantic drama films
Films directed by K. S. Adhiyaman
Hindi films remade in other languages
2006 romantic drama films